The Kiama Reporter and Illawarra Journal, also published as Kiama Reporter and The Reporter and Illawarra Journal, was a semi-weekly, then later a weekly English language newspaper published in Kiama, New South Wales, Australia.

Newspaper history 
The Kiama Reporter and Illawarra Journal was published from circa 1876-1878 until 1947. It was published under the title Kiama Reporter from 1886-1887 and The Reporter and Illawarra Journal from 1887–1894. The circulation was semi-weekly until 1920 when publication changed to weekly. In 1947 The Kiama Reporter and Illawarra Journal merged with The Kiama Independent and Shoalhaven Advertiser to form Kiama Independent.

Digitisation 
The Kiama Reporter and Illawarra Journal has been digitised as part of the Australian Newspapers Digitisation Program of the National Library of Australia.

See also 
List of newspapers in Australia
List of newspapers in New South Wales

External links

References 

Defunct newspapers published in New South Wales
Newspapers on Trove